Midnight Madonna is a 1937 American drama film directed by James Flood and written by David Boehm, Gladys Lehman and Doris Malloy. The film stars Warren William, Edward Ellis, Jonathan Hale, Mady Correll, and Kitty Clancy. The film was released on July 2, 1937, by Paramount Pictures.

Plot
Gambler Blackie Denbo helps Kay Barrie as her daughter inherits a fortune and is taken away by her estranged father.

Cast 
Warren William as Blackie Denbo
Mady Correll as Kay Barrie
Kitty Clancy as Penny Long
Edward Ellis as Judge Clark
Robert Baldwin as Vinny Long
Jonathan Hale as Stuart Kirkland
Joe Sawyer as Wolfe
Joseph Crehan as Moe Grinnell
Irene Franklin as Cafe Proprietor
Nick Copeland as Ed Kerrigan
Frank Reicher as Vincent Long II
May Wallace as Mrs. Withers
Buddy Messinger as Messenger

References

External links 
 

1937 films
1930s English-language films
Paramount Pictures films
American drama films
1937 drama films
Films directed by James Flood
American black-and-white films
1930s American films